Friends After 3.11 is a 2011 Japanese documentary film directed and co-edited by Shunji Iwai. The film explores the aftermath of the 2011 Tōhoku earthquake and tsunami, featuring actress Miyuki Matsuda and anti-nuclear activist Kokoro Fujinami.

Release
Friends After 3.11 premiered on television, being broadcast on SKY PerfecTV! on 1 October 2011.

On 15 February 2012, the film screened at the 62nd Berlin International Film Festival. A "theatrical version" of the film was released at Auditorium Shibuya in Tokyo, Japan, on 10 March 2012.

Reception
Fionnuala Halligan, in her review of the film for Screen Daily, wrote: "As the title suggests, Shunji Iwai focuses on his friends in this documentary, and it is hampered by his inability to cut their testimonies short across lengthy and often repetitive interviews. Despite this, however, this is a cumulatively affecting film and an intriguing insight into the Japanese mindset on what is becoming a growing struggle within the country."

References

External links
 

2010s Japanese films
Japanese documentary films
2011 documentary films
2011 films
Films directed by Shunji Iwai
Documentary films about nuclear technology
Films shot in Japan
2011 television films